Mark David McGwire (born October 1, 1963), nicknamed "Big Mac", is an American former professional baseball first baseman who played 16 seasons in Major League Baseball (MLB) from 1986 to 2001 for the Oakland Athletics and the St. Louis Cardinals. He won two World Series championships, one with Oakland as a player in 1989 and one with St. Louis as a coach in 2011. One of the most prolific home run hitters in baseball history, McGwire hit 583 home runs during his career, which ranked 5th-most in MLB history at the time of his retirement and currently ranks 11th. He holds the major-league career record for at bats per home run ratio (10.6), and is the former record holder for both home runs in a single season (70 in 1998) and home runs hit by a rookie (49 in 1987).

McGwire led the major leagues in home runs in five different seasons, and set the major-league record for home runs hit in a four-season period from 1996 to 1999 with 245. He demonstrated exemplary patience as a batter, producing a career .394 on-base percentage (OBP) and twice leading the major leagues in bases on balls. McGwire also led the league in runs batted in once, on-base percentage twice, and slugging percentage four times. Injuries cut short even greater potential, as he reached 140 games played in just eight of 16 total seasons. Injuries particularly cut into his playing time in 2000 and 2001 and factored into his decision to retire.

With the Cardinals in 1998, McGwire joined Cubs slugger Sammy Sosa in a chase for the single-season home-run record set by Roger Maris in 1961. McGwire surpassed Maris and finished with 70 home runs, a record that Barry Bonds would break three years later with 73.

McGwire was one of several central figures in baseball's steroids scandal. In 2010, McGwire publicly admitted to using performance-enhancing drugs during a large portion of his career.

Early life
McGwire was born in the Los Angeles suburb of Pomona, California. His father was a dentist. He attended Damien High School in La Verne, California, where he played baseball, golf, and basketball. He was drafted in the 8th round by the Montreal Expos in the 1981 amateur draft, but did not sign.

College career
He played college baseball at the University of Southern California (where he was a teammate of Randy Johnson, Jack Del Rio, and Rodney Peete) under coach Rod Dedeaux.

McGwire was selected by the Athletics with the 10th overall selection in the 1984 MLB draft.

He was a member of the silver medal-winning entry of the United States national team that same year at the Summer Olympics in Los Angeles, with Japan finishing ahead for gold medal.

Professional career

Draft and minor leagues
After three years at USC and a stint on the 1984 U.S. Olympic team, McGwire was drafted tenth overall in the 1984 Major League Baseball draft by the Oakland Athletics.

Oakland Athletics (1986–1997)
McGwire debuted in the major leagues in August 1986, hitting three home runs and nine runs batted in in 18 games.

Rookie home-run record and major-league leader (1987)
Retaining his rookie status in 1987, McGwire took center stage in baseball with his home-run hitting. He hit just four in the month of April, but followed in May with 15 and another nine in June. Before the All-Star break arrived, he had totaled 33 home runs and earned a spot on the American League All-Star team. On August 11, he broke Al Rosen's AL rookie record of 37 home runs. Three days later, McGwire broke the major-league record of 38, which Frank Robinson and Wally Berger had jointly held. In September, McGwire hit nine more home runs while posting monthly personal bests of a .351 batting average, .419 on-base percentage (OBP) and 11 doubles (2B). With 49 home runs and two games remaining in the regular season for him to reach 50 home runs, he missed the games in order to attend the birth of his first child. McGwire also totaled 118 runs batted in, a .289 batting average, 97 runs scored, 28 doubles, a .618 slugging percentage and a .370 on-base percentage (OBP). McGwire's 49 home runs as a rookie stood as a major league record until Aaron Judge hit 52 for the New York Yankees in 2017.

Not only did McGwire lead the AL in home runs in 1987, but he also tied for the major-league lead with Chicago Cubs right fielder Andre Dawson. McGwire also led the major leagues in slugging, finished second in the AL in adjusted on-base plus slugging percentage (OPS+, 164) and total bases (344) and placed third in RBI and on-base plus slugging (OPS, .987). He was unanimously chosen as the AL Rookie of the Year Award and finished sixth overall in the AL Most Valuable Player Award voting.

More All-Star appearances (1988–1991)

From 1988 to 1990, McGwire followed with 32, 33, and 39 home runs, respectively, becoming the first Major Leaguer to hit 30+ home runs in each of his first four full seasons. On July 3 and 4, 1988, he hit game-winning home runs in the 16th inning of both games. Through May 2009, McGwire was tied for third all-time with Joe DiMaggio in home runs over his first two calendar years in the major leagues (71), behind Chuck Klein (83) and Ryan Braun (79).

McGwire's most famous home run with the A's was likely his game-winning solo shot in the bottom of the ninth inning of Game 3 of the 1988 World Series against the Los Angeles Dodgers and former A's closer Jay Howell. McGwire's game-winner brought the A's their only victory in the 1988 World Series, which they lost in five games; however, McGwire and his fellow Bash Brother, José Canseco, played a large part in the 1989 championship club that defeated the San Francisco Giants in the famous "Earthquake Series."

Working diligently on his defense at first base, McGwire bristled at the notion that he was a one-dimensional player. He was generally regarded as a good fielder in his early years, even winning a Gold Glove Award in 1990, the only one that the Yankees' Don Mattingly would not win between 1985 and 1994. In later years, his mobility decreased along with his defensive ability. His batting averages after his rookie season plummeted to .260, .231, and .235 from 1988 to 1990. In 1991, he bottomed out with a .201 average and 22 homers. Manager Tony La Russa sat him for the final game of the season to avoid causing his batting average to dip below .200. Despite the declining averages during this time of his career, McGwire's high base-on-balls totals allowed him to maintain an acceptable on-base percentage. In fact, when he hit .201, his OPS+ was 103, just over the league average.

McGwire stated in an interview with Sports Illustrated that 1991 was the "worst year" of his life, with his on-field performance and marriage difficulties, and that he "didn't lift a weight" that entire season. With all that behind him, McGwire rededicated himself to working out harder than ever and received visual therapy from a sports vision specialist.

Career resurgence (1992–1997)
The "new look" McGwire hit 42 homers and batted .268 in 1992, with an outstanding OPS+ of 175 (the highest of his career to that point), and put on a victorious home-run-hitting show at the Home Run Derby during the 1992 All-Star break. His performance propelled the A's to the American League West Division title in 1992, their fourth in five seasons. The A's lost in the playoffs to the eventual World Series champion Toronto Blue Jays.

Foot injuries limited McGwire to a total of 74 games in 1993 and 1994, and just nine home runs in each of the two seasons. He played just 104 games in 1995, but his proportional totals were much improved, as he hit 39 home runs in 317 at-bats. In 1996, McGwire belted a major-league-leading 52 homers in 423 at-bats. He also hit for a career-high .312 average and led the league in both slugging and on-base percentage.

McGwire's total of 363 home runs with the Athletics surpassed the previous franchise record. He was selected or voted to nine American League All-Star teams while playing for the A's, including six consecutive appearances from 1987 through 1992. On April 21, 1997, McGwire became the fourth and final player to hit a home run over the left-field roof of Detroit's Tiger Stadium, joining Harmon Killebrew, Frank Howard and Cecil Fielder. The blast was estimated to have traveled 491 feet.

St. Louis Cardinals (1997–2001)
On July 31, having already amassed 34 home runs in the 1997 season, McGwire was traded from the Oakland Athletics to the St. Louis Cardinals for T. J. Mathews, Eric Ludwick and Blake Stein. Despite playing just two-thirds of the season in the American League, he finished ninth in home runs. In 51 games with the Cardinals to finish the 1997 season, McGwire compiled a .253 batting average, 24 home runs, and 42 RBI. Overall in 1997, McGwire led the majors with 58 home runs. He also finished third in the major leagues in slugging percentage (.646), fourth in OPS (1.039), fifth in OPS+ (170), tenth in RBI (123), and ninth in walks (101). He placed 16th in the NL MVP voting.

It was the last year of his contract, so there was speculation that McGwire would play for the Cardinals only for the remainder of the season, then seek a long-term deal, possibly in Southern California, where he still lived; however, McGwire signed a contract to stay in St. Louis. It is also believed that McGwire later encouraged Jim Edmonds, another Southern California resident who was traded to St. Louis, to forgo free agency and sign a contract with the Cardinals in 2000.

Single-season home run record chase (1998)

As the 1998 season progressed, it became clear that McGwire, Seattle Mariners outfielder Ken Griffey Jr., and Chicago Cubs outfielder Sammy Sosa were all on track to break Roger Maris's single-season home run record. The race to break the record first attracted media attention as the home-run leader changed often throughout the season. On August 19, Sosa hit his 48th home run to move ahead of McGwire; however, later that day McGwire hit his 48th and 49th home runs to regain the lead.
On September 8, 1998, McGwire hit a pitch by the Cubs' Steve Trachsel over the left-field wall for his record-breaking 62nd home run, setting off massive celebrations at Busch Stadium. The fact that the game was against the Cubs meant that Sosa was able to congratulate McGwire personally on his achievement. Members of Maris's family were also present at the game. The ball was given to McGwire in a ceremony on the field by the stadium worker who found it.

McGwire finished the 1998 season with 70 home runs (including five in his last three games), four ahead of Sosa's 66, a record that was broken three seasons later in 2001 by Barry Bonds with 73.

McGwire was honored with the inaugural Babe Ruth Home Run Award for leading Major League Baseball in home runs. Although McGwire had the prestige of the home-run record, Sammy Sosa (who had fewer home runs but more RBI and stolen bases) won the 1998 NL MVP award, as his contributions helped propel the Cubs to the playoffs (the Cardinals finished third in the NL Central). Many credited the Sosa-McGwire home run chase in 1998 with "saving baseball" by attracting new, younger fans and bringing back old fans soured by the 1994–95 Major League Baseball strike.

Later playing career (1999–2001)

McGwire kept his high level of offensive production from 1998 going in 1999 while setting or extending several significant records. For the fourth consecutive season, he led MLB in home runs with 65. It was also his fourth consecutive season with at least 50 home runs, extending his own major league record. Sosa, who hit 63 home runs in 1999, again trailed McGwire. Thus, they became the first, and still only, players in major league history to hit 60 or more home runs in consecutive seasons. McGwire also set a record from 1998 to 1999 for home runs in a two-season period with 135. He also owned the highest four-season home-run total, with 245 from 1996 to 1999. In 1999, he drove in an NL-leading 147 runs while only having 145 hits, the highest RBI-per-hit tally for a season in baseball history.

Following the 1999 season, McGwire and the Cardinals exercised a mutual option in his contract for the 2001 season which would pay him $11 million for the 2001 season. Shortly before the 2001 season, McGwire and the Cardinals agreed to another extension through the 2004 season for $30 million which, according to Phil Rogers in the Chicago Tribune, was far less than he could have made in free agency.

However, in 2000 and 2001, McGwire's statistics declined relative to previous years as he struggled to avoid injury, hitting 32 home runs in 89 games in 2000 and 29 in 97 games in 2001. He retired after the 2001 season.

Coaching career (2010–2018)

After his playing career ended, McGwire demonstrated coaching ability, personally assisting players such as Matt Holliday, Bobby Crosby and Skip Schumaker before accepting an official role as hitting coach with an MLB team. On October 26, 2009, Cardinals manager Tony La Russa confirmed that McGwire would become the club's fifth hitting coach of La Russa's tenure with the Cardinals, replacing Hal McRae. McGwire received a standing ovation prior to the Cardinals' home opener on April 12, 2010. In his three seasons as Cardinals hitting coach, the team's prolific offense led the National League in batting and on-base percentage, and the team finished second in runs scored.

In early November 2012, McGwire rejected a contract extension to return as Cardinals hitting coach for the 2013 season. Instead, he accepted an offer for the same position with the Los Angeles Dodgers in order to be closer to his wife and five children.

On June 11, 2013, McGwire was ejected for the first time as a coach during a bench-clearing brawl with the Arizona Diamondbacks. He was suspended for two games starting the next day.

On December 2, 2015, he was named bench coach for the San Diego Padres. He left the team after the 2018 season.

Honors, records and achievements
Known as one of the top sluggers of his era, McGwire ended his career with 583 home runs, which was fifth-most in history when he retired. When he hit his 500th career home run in 1999, he did so in 5,487 career at-bats, the fewest in major league history. He led all of MLB in home runs in five different seasons: 1987 and each season from 1996 to 1999. His total of 245 home runs from 1996 to 1999 is the highest four-season home-run output in major league history. In each of those four seasons, he exceeded 50 home runs, becoming the first player to do so. He was also the first player to hit 49 or more home runs five times, including his rookie-season record of 49 in 1987. With a career average of one home every 10.61 at-bats, he holds the MLB record for most home runs per at-bat, leading second-place Babe Ruth by more than a full at-bat (11.76).

As of 2015, McGwire owned three of the four lowest single-season AB/HR ratios in MLB history, which covered his 1996, 1998 and 1999 seasons; they were actually the top three seasons in MLB history until Bonds broke his single-season home-run record in 2001. McGwire's 1997 season ranked 13th. Considered one of the slowest runners in the game, McGwire had the fewest career triples (six) of any player with 5,000 or more at-bats, and had just 12 stolen bases while being caught stealing eight times.

Honors and distinctions
In a 1999 list of the 100 greatest baseball players, The Sporting News ranked McGwire at number 91. The list had been compiled during the 1998 season and included statistics through the 1997 season. That year, he was elected to the Major League Baseball All-Century Team. In 2005, The Sporting News published an update of its list with McGwire at number 84.

A five-mile stretch of Interstate 70 in Missouri in St. Louis and near Busch Stadium was named Mark McGwire Highway to honor his 70-home-run achievement, along with his various good works for the city. In May 2010, St. Louis politicians succeeded in passing a state bill to change the name to Mark Twain Highway.

National Baseball Hall of Fame consideration
McGwire first became eligible for Hall of Fame voting in 2007. For election, a player needs to be listed on 75% of ballots cast; falling under 5% removes a player from future consideration. Between 2007 and 2010, McGwire's performance held steady, receiving 128 votes (23.5%) in 2007, 128 votes (23.6%) in 2008, 118 votes (21.9%) in 2009, and 128 votes (23.7%) in 2010. The 2011 ballot resulted in his first sub-20% total of 115 votes (19.8%), and McGwire's total votes continued to decline (112 votes (19.5%) in 2012, 96 votes (16.9%) in 2013, 63 votes (11.0%) in 2014 and 55 votes (10.0%) in 2015) until he was eliminated after receiving only 54 votes (12.3%) in 2016.

Records

Playing career totals
In 16 seasons playing major league baseball (1986–2001), McGwire accumulated the following career totals:

 G 1,874
 ABs 6,187
 Runs 1,167
 Hits 1,626
 Doubles 252
 Triples 6
 HR 583
 RBI 1,414
 GIDP 147
 BB 1,317
 IBB 150

 HBP 75
 SH 3
 SF 78
 Strikeouts 1,596
 SBs 12
 CS 8
 BA .263
 OBP .394
 SLG .588
 OPS .982
 OPS+ 162

Steroid use
In a 1998 article by Associated Press writer Steve Wilstein, McGwire admitted to taking androstenedione, an over-the-counter muscle enhancement product that had already been banned by the World Anti-Doping Agency, the NFL, and the IOC; however, use of the substance was not prohibited by Major League Baseball at the time, and it was not federally classified as an anabolic steroid in the United States until 2004.

Jose Canseco released a book, Juiced: Wild Times, Rampant 'Roids, Smash Hits & How Baseball Got Big, in 2005. In it, he wrote positively about steroids and made various claims—among them, that McGwire had used performance-enhancing drugs since the 1980s and that Canseco had personally injected him with them.

In 2005, McGwire and Canseco were among 11 baseball players and executives subpoenaed to testify at a congressional hearing on steroids. During his testimony on March 17, 2005, McGwire declined to answer questions under oath when he appeared before the House Government Reform Committee. In a tearful opening statement, McGwire said:

On January 11, 2010, McGwire admitted to using steroids on and off for a decade and said, "I wish I had never touched steroids. It was foolish and it was a mistake. I truly apologize. Looking back, I wish I had never played during the steroid era." He admitted using them in the 1989/90 offseason and then after he was injured in 1993. He admitted using them on occasion throughout the 1990s, including during the 1998 season. McGwire said that he used steroids to recover from injuries.

McGwire's decision to admit using steroids was prompted by his decision to become hitting coach of the St. Louis Cardinals. According to McGwire, he took steroids for health reasons rather than to improve performance.

Personal life
McGwire's brother Dan McGwire was a quarterback for the Seattle Seahawks and Miami Dolphins of the NFL in the early 1990s, and was a first-round draft choice out of San Diego State University. He has another brother, Jay McGwire, a bodybuilder, who wrote a book in 2010 detailing their shared steroid use.

McGwire married Stephanie Slemer—a former pharmaceutical sales representative from the St. Louis area—in Las Vegas on April 20, 2002. On June 1, 2010, their triplet girls were born: Monet Rose, Marlo Rose, and Monroe Rose. They join brothers Max and Mason. Mason was drafted by the Chicago Cubs in the eighth round of the 2022 MLB draft. They reside in a gated community in Shady Canyon, Irvine, California. Together they created the Mark McGwire Foundation for Children to support agencies that help children who have been sexually and physically abused come to terms with a difficult childhood. Mark has a son, Matthew (b. 1987), from a previous marriage (1984–1990, divorced) to Kathleen Hughes.

Prior to admitting to using steroids, McGwire avoided the media and spent much of his free time playing golf. He also worked as a hitting coach for Major League players Matt Holliday, Bobby Crosby, Chris Duncan and Skip Schumaker.

McGwire appeared as himself in season 7, episode 13 of the sitcom Mad About You.

McGwire provided his voice for a 1999 episode of The Simpsons titled "Brother's Little Helper", where he played himself.

See also

 1998 Major League Baseball home run record chase
 At bats per home run
 List of doping cases in sport
 List of Major League Baseball home run records
 List of Major League Baseball career bases on balls leaders
 List of Major League Baseball career extra base hits leaders
 List of Major League Baseball career home run leaders
 List of Major League Baseball career OPS leaders
 List of Major League Baseball career runs scored leaders
 List of Major League Baseball career runs batted in leaders
 List of Major League Baseball career strikeouts by batters leaders
 List of Major League Baseball career slugging percentage leaders
 List of St. Louis Cardinals team records
 Major League Baseball titles leaders
 St. Louis Cardinals award winners and league leaders

References

Further reading

External links

 

1963 births
Living people
All-American college baseball players
American League All-Stars
American League home run champions
American sportspeople in doping cases
Baseball players at the 1983 Pan American Games
Baseball players at the 1984 Summer Olympics
Baseball players from California
Doping cases in baseball
Gold Glove Award winners
Huntsville Stars players
Los Angeles Dodgers coaches
Major League Baseball bench coaches
Major League Baseball controversies
Major League Baseball first basemen
Major League Baseball hitting coaches
Major League Baseball Rookie of the Year Award winners
Medalists at the 1983 Pan American Games
Medalists at the 1984 Summer Olympics
Modesto A's players
National League All-Stars
National League home run champions
National League RBI champions
Oakland Athletics players
Olympic silver medalists for the United States in baseball
Pan American Games bronze medalists for the United States
Pan American Games medalists in baseball
San Diego Padres coaches
Silver Slugger Award winners
Sportspeople from Irvine, California
Sportspeople from Pomona, California
St. Louis Cardinals coaches
St. Louis Cardinals players
Tacoma Tigers players
USC Trojans baseball players
Anchorage Glacier Pilots players